Beau Dommage was a rock band from Montreal, Quebec, who achieved success in Quebec and France in the 1970s. The group's style included rich vocal harmonies and elements borrowed from folk and country music.

History
Beau Dommage started in 1972 as an offshoot of the theatrical group "La Quenouille Bleue". Founders Pierre Huet, Robert Léger and Michel Rivard were joined by Pierre Bertrand, Réal Desrosiers and Marie Michèle Desrosiers (no relation).

The group's first album, Beau Dommage, was released in 1974 and broke sales records at the time. The next year, Où est passée la noce? reached Platinum (as awarded by the CRIA before May 1, 2008, 100,000 units) on its first day of sales. The group met with considerable success on its yearly tours of Europe between 1975 and 1978, and also performed on numerous occasions in Quebec and the rest of Canada.

The group disbanded in 1978 and reunited in 1984 to perform twice at the Montreal Forum and, from those concerts, produce two live albums. They reunited one last time in 1994 to produce a second self-titled album Beau Dommage and tour Quebec in 1995. They showed up during the 2005 Francofolies in Montreal and were honoured by the other artists. 

On 19 July 2013, Canada Post issued an undenominated permanent commemorative postage stamp depicting the seven members of Beau Dommage.  It was sold in booklets of 10, or as part of a souvenir sheet of four alongside Rush, the Guess Who, and the Tragically Hip.

Members
 Pierre Bertrand - guitar, bass, vocals
 Marie Michèle Desrosiers - keyboard, vocals
 Réal Desrosiers - drums
 Michel Hinton - keyboard (starting in 1975)
 Pierre Huet - songwriter
 Robert Léger - keyboard, flute
 Michel Rivard - guitar, melodica, keyboards, vocals

Discography

Albums
 Beau Dommage (1974), Capitol Records
 Où Est Passée La Noce? (1975), Capitol Records
 Passagers (1977), Capitol Records
 Un Autre Jour Arrive En Ville... (1977), Capitol Records
 Au Forum De Montréal (1984), Polydor
 Au Forum De Montréal Vol. 2 (1984), Polydor
 Leurs Plus Grands Succès En Spectacle (1988), Polydor
 Beau Dommage au Forum (1992), Capitol Records
 Beau Domage (1994), Audiogram, L'Équipe Spectra 
 Rideau (1995), Audiogram

Singles
"Le Picbois" / "A Toutes Les Fois" (1974)
"Tous Les Palmiers" / "Montreal" (1975)
"Harmonie Du Soir A Chateauguay" / "La Complainte Du Phoque En Alaska" (1975)
"Tous Les Palmiers" / "Le Géant Beaupré" (1975)
"C'est Samedi Soir" (1976)
"Le Blues D'la Métropole" / "Assis Dans'cuisine" (1976)
"Heureusement Qu'il Y A La Nuit" / "Bon Debarras" (1976)
"Amène Pas Ta Gang" (1976)
"Motel Mon Repos" / "J'ai Oublié Le Jour" (1976)
"Gisèle En Automne" / "Générique" / "Son Ancien Chum" (1977, EP)
"Seize Ans En Soixante Seize" / "Contre Lui" (1977)
"Tout Va Bien" / "Marie-Chantale" (1977)
"Hockey" / "Le Coeur Endormi" (1977)
"Berceuse Pour Moi Toute Seule" (1977)
"Rouler La Nuit" / "Le Passager De L'Heure De Pointe" (1977)
"Le Rapide Blanc" (1984)
"Échappé Belle" (1994)
"Tout Simplement Jaloux..." / "Grande Cheminée" (1994)

Compilations
Les Grands Succès De Beau Dommage (1978), Capitol Records
 Plus De 60 Minutes Avec... Beau Dommage (1987), Capitol Records
 L'intégrale (1991), Capitol Records
Le Meilleur De Beau Dommage (1990), EMI France
Anthologie (1999), EMI Canada
L'album De Famille (2009), EMI Canada
Photos De Famille (2010), Musique EMI Canada
Des Airs De Famille (2010), EMI Canada
Icon (2013), Universal Music Canada
Coffret 40e Anniversaire (2014), Universal Music Canada

Awards and nominations
Nominee: Most Promising Female Vocalist of the Year, Juno Awards of 1975
Nominee: Group of the Year, Juno Awards of 1976
Nominee: Best Selling Album, Beau Dommage, Juno Awards of 1976
Winner: Group of the Year, Félix Awards, 1995
Nominee: Best Selling Francophone Album, Beau Dommage, Juno Awards of 1996

References

External links
Beau Dommage CanadianBands.com entry
Beau Dommage in The Encyclopedia of Music in Canada.
Beau Dommage in The Canadian Encyclopedia.
ProgQuebec: Beau Dommage

1995 in Canadian music
Musical groups established in 1974
Musical groups disestablished in 1978
Musical groups reestablished in 1994
Musical groups from Montreal
Canadian progressive rock groups
Capitol Records artists
Audiogram (label) artists